John Peter Zubek (March 20, 1925 – August 24, 1974) was a Czechoslovakian-born Canadian psychologist known for his research on psychophysiology and sensory deprivation. In his obituary for the journal Canadian Psychology, Donald O. Hebb described him as "[o]ne of Canada's most distinguished psychologists".

Biography
Zubek was born on March 20, 1925 in Trnovec, Czechoslovakia. When he was six, he and his family moved to Grand Forks, British Columbia, Canada. He graduated from the University of British Columbia in 1946, after which he earned his M.A. in social psychology from the University of Toronto. He then attended Johns Hopkins University in the United States, where he worked with Clifford Morgan to obtain his Ph.D. in physiological psychology in 1950. Also in 1950, he joined the faculty of McGill University in Canada as an assistant professor, continuing to hold this position until 1953, when he joined the University of Manitoba as Professor and Head of the Department of Psychology. He continued to serve as Head of the Department of Psychology at the University of Manitoba until 1961, when he became a research professor there. In 1967, he was elected a fellow of the Canadian Psychological Association, and in 1973, he received the Clifford J. Robson award from the University of Manitoba. He died in Winnipeg, Manitoba, Canada on August 24, 1974.

References

Further reading

1925 births
1974 deaths
Canadian psychologists
Czechoslovak emigrants to Canada
People from Skalica District
University of British Columbia alumni
University of Toronto alumni
Johns Hopkins University alumni
Academic staff of McGill University
Academic staff of the University of Manitoba
20th-century psychologists